The Queen's Square may refer to:

A short story by Dorothy Sayers, originally published in Hangman's Holiday
The village centre in Adeyfield, Hertfordshire, England

See also
Queen's Square (disambiguation)